Cif is a French brand of household cleaning products owned by the British company Unilever, known as Jif in Australia, New Zealand, Japan, Middle East and the Nordic countries.

Cif was launched in France in 1965 and was marketed in competition against scouring powders (such as Vim scouring powder) as a creamy and hence protective, but powerful household cleaner.

Name
Cif is sold under the names Jif, Vim, Viss and Handy Andy, depending on which of the 51 countries it is sold in.

In Sweden, and South Africa, the products were originally sold under the name Vim before this was changed to Jif, the launch name in the United Kingdom, Ireland, the Netherlands and Hong Kong.

In January 2001, the name in most of these countries was changed to Cif in order to align marketing and product inventories across the continent. Despite this, many in Ireland, continue to call the product Jif. The name change from Jif to Cif was confirmed by Unilever in December 2000.

In Belgium, Finland and Portugal, the product was known as Vim for quite some time, after which it became Cif. In Canada and India, it is still called Vim. Recently advertisements for Cif surface grease cleaner have started to appear in India, while the Vim name is still used for the kitchen dish cleaning product. In Germany, the cleaner's name is Viss. In Norway, the product is still today traded as Jif and owned by Orkla ASA. It is also still traded in Iraq as Jif, with local Arabic and English writing.

Products
 Cif Bathroom Mousse                                           
 Cif Stainless Steel Cleaner
 Cif Bathroom Cleaner
 Cif Kitchen Cleaner
 Cif Power Cream
 Cif Cream Cleaner, a non-abrasive version

References

External links 
 UK product website
 Australian Jif product website
 German Viss product website (in German)
 Japanese Jif product website (in Japanese)

Unilever brands
Reckitt brands
Cleaning products
Cleaning product brands
Orkla ASA
Products introduced in 1969